Rhodolaena altivola is a tree in the family Sarcolaenaceae. It is endemic to Madagascar. The naturalist and explorer Alfred Russel Wallace described it as "among the most magnificent flowering plants in the world".

Description
Rhodolaena altivola grows as a small to medium-sized tree. It has medium, ovate leaves. The inflorescences have one or two flowers on a long stem. The fruits are large and woody.

Distribution and habitat
Rhodolaena altivola is only found in the eastern regions of Atsinanana and Analanjirofo.

Threats
Rhodolaena altivola is threatened by shifting cultivation and wildfires. Its future population decline due to habitat loss is predicted at more than 80%. No population of the trees is currently in a protected area. The status of the species is critically endangered.

References

altivola
Endemic flora of Madagascar
Trees of Madagascar
Plants described in 1805